This is a list of notable secondary schools in Hungary:
 A Orchidea Hungarian-English Bilingual School
 Berzsenyi Dániel Gimnázium
 Bolyai János Gimnázium
 Budai Ciszterci Szent Imre Gimnázium
 Czuczor Gergely Bencés Gimnázium és Kollégium
 Dr Ambedkar School, (Miskolc)
 ELTE Apáczai Csere János Gyakorlógimnázium
 ELTE Radnóti Miklós Gyakorlóiskola
 ELTE Trefort Ágoston Gyakorlóiskola
 Eötvös József Gimnázium
 Budapesti Evangélikus Gimnázium (Fasori Gimnázium)
 Fazekas Mihály Gimnázium (Budapest)
 Fazekas Mihály Gimnázium (Debrecen)
 Földes Ferenc Gimnázium
 Herman Ottó Gimnázium
 Jurisich Miklos Gimnázium (JMG)
 Katona József Gimnázium és Számítástechnikai Szakközépiskola
 Kazinczy Ferenc Gimnázium és Kollégium
 Kölcsey Ferenc Gimnázium (Budapest)
 Kőrösi Csoma Sándor Két Tanítási Nyelvű Baptista Gimnázium
 Lovassy László Gimnázium
 Madách Imre Gimnázium (Budapest)
 Magyar-Angol Tannyelvű Gimnázium
 Móra Ferenc Secondary School
 Pannonhalmi Bencés Gimnázium és Kollégium
 Petőfi Sándor Gimnázium
 Piarista Gimnázium
 Révai Miklós Gimnázium
 Szent István Gimnázium
 Szent László Gimnázium
 Szent Margit Gimnázium
 Toldy Ferenc Gimnázium
 Városmajori Gimnázium
 Weiss Manfréd Szakközépiskola, Szakiskola és Kollégium
 Serbian High School Nikola Tesla in Budapest

International schools:
 Gustave Eiffel French School of Budapest
 Thomas Mann Gymnasium
 The Budapest Japanese School
 British International School Budapest
 American International School of Budapest

See also
 Open access in Hungary to scholarly communication

References
Top 100 high schools in Hungary in 2022 (Eduline.hu)
List at the National Institute of Public Education (2004)

 
Hungary
Hungary
Schools
Schools
Schools